The 2003–04 North Carolina Tar Heels men's basketball team represented the University of North Carolina at Chapel Hill during the 2003–04 NCAA Division I men's basketball season. Their head coach was Roy Williams. No team captains were selected for this season, the first, and so far, only time this has happened in program history.  The team played its home games in the Dean Smith Center in Chapel Hill, North Carolina as a member of the Atlantic Coast Conference.

Roster

Wes Miller was not eligible to play this season because he transferred from James Madison.

After playing as a walk-on in the previous season, David Noel received a basketball scholarship to play beginning with this season.

Schedule and results

After Matt Doherty resigned from the men's basketball coaching position at the end of the previous season, Dean Smith once again persuaded Roy Williams to take the vacant position.  This time Williams accepted, becoming the head coach of the Tar Heels on April 14, 2003.

After the annual Blue-White Scrimmage and two exhibition games against North Carolina Central (then playing in NCAA Division II conference CIAA) and Team Nike, Williams' first game with the Tar Heels was against Old Dominion on November 22, 2003.  Williams received a standing ovation as he stepped onto the court of the sold out Smith Center.  With Smith and Bill Guthridge in attendance, the Tar Heels beat Old Dominion 90-64.  The win was Williams' 419th career win.

The 115 points scored against George Mason were the most points Tar Heel team had scored against an opponent since 1994.

The triple-overtime loss to Wake Forest at home set several program records.  The 114 points scored in this game are the most points scored in a Tar Heel loss.  The Wake Forest loss was only the fifth time a game went into triple overtime in program history.  The last time a game went into triple overtime prior to this season was in the 1982-83 season against Tulane (also the team, albeit in 1976, that the Tar Heels played against to set the program and ACC record of four overtimes).  The 119 points that Wake Forest scored are the most points an opponent has scored over the Tar Heels, breaking the 112 points Maryland scored at Cole Field House in the previous season.  Those points are also the most an opponent has scored against the Tar Heels in the Smith Center.

Both teams scored 16 points in the first overtime.  The Tar Heels' 16 points are the Tar Heels' third most points in an overtime period, and Wake Forest's 16 points are the second most points a Tar Heel opponent has scored in halftime.  In the second overtime, both teams only scored two points, respectfully the fewest points the Tar Heels and one of their opponents have scored in a halftime.  The 13 points Wake Forest scored in the third overtime are the third most points a Tar Heel opponent has scored in an overtime.

The win against Miami was the 200th win in the Smith Center.

The Tar Heels beat Connecticut for the second consecutive year.  The win was also the Tar Heels' tenth win over a number one ranked team (according to the AP Poll).  At the time, the Tar Heels tied UCLA for most wins over a number one ranked team.  (The Tar Heels now own this record outright, with 13 wins over number one ranked teams to UCLA's 12.)

The Tar Heels finished with their first winning record in two seasons, 17-10, but only finished fifth in ACC play with a conference record of 8-8.  They were eliminated in the quarterfinals of the 2004 ACC men's basketball tournament by Georgia Tech.  However, their overall record by the time of their loss in the ACC Tournament allowed them to play in the 2004 NCAA Division I men's basketball tournament.  The Tar Heels' NCAA tournament run ended with a defeat against Texas in the tournament's Second Round.

|-
!colspan=9 style="background:#56A0D3; color:#FFFFFF;"| Exhibition

|-
!colspan=9 style="background:#56A0D3; color:#FFFFFF;"| Regular Season

|-
!colspan=12 style="background:#56A0D3; color:#FFFFFF;"| ACC Tournament

|-
!colspan=12 style="background:#56A0D3; color:#FFFFFF;"| NCAA tournament

Notes

References

North Carolina Tar Heels men's basketball seasons
North Carolina
2003 in sports in North Carolina
2004 in sports in North Carolina
North Carolina